The following television stations broadcast on digital channel 18 in Mexico:

 XHCRT-TDT in Cerro Azul, Veracruz
 XHCTAG-TDT in Aguascalientes, Aguascalientes
 XHCTZ-TDT in Coatzacoalcos, Veracruz
 XHFX-TDT in Morelia, Michoacán
 XHGZP-TDT in Torreón, Coahuila
 XHHAS-TDT in Huásabas, Sonora
 XHHCU-TDT in Mexico City
 XHKF-TDT in Colima, Colima
 XHMEX-TDT in Mexicali, Baja California
 XHQCZ-TDT on Cerro del Zamorano, Querétaro
 XHSEN-TDT in Santiago Ixcuintla, Nayarit
 XHSFS-TDT in San Felipe de Jesús, Sonora
 XHSGU-TDT in Guaymas, Sonora
 XHSOZ-TDT in Sombrerete, Zacatecas
 XHSPRSC-TDT in San Cristóbal de las Casas, Chiapas

18